The Zemba (singular: OmuZemba, plural: OvaZemba) are an indigenous people, residing in Angola and in Namibia.

Culture

Clothing and hair style
The Zemba women have a unique pure black hairstyle. It is emphasized with the decorations made of thin beads of white, red, blue and yellow colours.

Human rights
February 2012, traditional Zemba issued a human rights complaints declaration to the Government of Namibia, the African Union and to the OHCHR of the United Nations that lists violations of civil, cultural, economic, environmental, social and political rights perpetrated by the Government of Namibia.

In September 2012 the United Nations Special Rapporteur on the Rights of Indigenous Peoples visited Namibia. He stated that in Namibia there is a lack of recognition of the minority indigenous tribes' communal lands.

November 23, 2012, Zemba communities from Omuhonga and Epupa, together with the Himba people,  protested in Okanguati against Namibia's plans to construct a dam in the Kunene River in the Baynes Mountains and against increasing mining operations on their traditional land and human rights violations against them.

March 25, 2013, Zemba joined over thousand Himba people to march in protest again, this time in Opuwo, against the ongoing human rights violations that they endure in Namibia. They expressed their frustration over their chief not being recognized as a "Traditional Authority" by government,  plans to build the Orokawe dam in the Baynes Mountains at the Kunene River, culturally inappropriate education, the illegal fencing of parts of their traditional land, the lack of land rights to the territory that they have lived upon for centuries, and against the implementation of the Communal Land Reform Act of 2002.

See also
 Tjimba people
 Himba people
 Herero people

References

Indigenous peoples of Southern Africa
Human rights abuses in Angola
Ethnic groups in Angola
Ethnic groups in Namibia
Human rights abuses in Namibia

hr:Zemba jezik
sw:Kizemba